Domino's Pizza Enterprises Limited (DPE) is the largest pizza chain in Australia in terms of network stores numbers and network sales, as well as the largest franchisee for the US Domino's Pizza brand in the world.  DPE is the exclusive master franchise for the Domino's brand network in Australia, New Zealand, Belgium, France, The Netherlands, Japan, Germany, Luxembourg, Denmark and Taiwan.  Across these markets, DPE has over 2,800 stores.  In May 2005 DPE became the first publicly listed pizza company in Australia.

In 2018, Domino's was inducted into the Queensland Business Leaders Hall of Fame.

Early years

Australia

The first Domino's store to open in Australia was in Springwood, Queensland, in 1983, and offered home delivery after home delivery was introduced into Australia by the Pizza Oven Family Restaurants located at multiple sites all over the southside of Brisbane owned by Paul Hughes & Bill Kerwick in 1981. The Australian and New Zealand Master Franchise was bought by Silvio's Dial-a-Pizza in 1993 and in 1995 the two brands merged and rebranded as Domino's Pizza.

New Zealand 
Domino's New Zealand was the first to introduce drone-delivery pizza in November 2016, partnering with Flirtey Drone Delivery.

Present day 
Australia

Currently, there are around 700 Domino's stores in Australia, making it the biggest pizza franchised business in the country. The Australian stores are spread right across the country, from the main capital cities like Canberra, Melbourne, Adelaide and Sydney, to more rural areas like Armidale.

Timeline
 1983: First Domino's store opened in Australia.
 1993: Silvio's Dial-a-Pizza bought Domino's Pizza.
 1995: Silvio's Dial-a-Pizza was merged into Domino's Pizza.
 1997: Domino's established the Domino's Partners Foundation.
 2000: Silvio's Dial-a-Pizza was renamed Domino's Pizza Australia.
 2001: Don Meij and Grant Bourke, the two largest franchisees at the time, merged their stores into the corporate store network to bring the total to 50 corporate stores and 128 franchised stores.
 2003: Domino's expanded into new markets in Victoria, Australia, and Wellington, New Zealand.
 2005: Domino's listed on the Australian Stock Exchange, becoming the first publicly listed Australian pizza company.
 2006: Domino's purchased existing Domino's operations in France, Belgium, the Netherlands and the principality of Monaco.
 2009: Domino's Australia launched an application for iPhone.
 2011: An online ordering mobile website was launched, as well as an application for Android ordering. Domino's hit 200,000 Facebook fans
 2014: Domino's launched Pizza Mogul, an initiative set to change the future of the pizza industry landscape.
 2015: Domino's launched GPS Driver Tracker, which allows customers track their order from the store.
 2016: Domino's launched the world first autonomous delivery vehicle, DRU  or Domino's Robotic Unit (now known as 'DOM').
2016: Domino's launched registered charity Give for Good
2017: Domino's installs the world's largest commercial Tesla Powerwall battery storage system in one of its Sydney stores, in order to overcome the limited capability of the electrical grid.
2018: Domino's launched voice ordering through Amazon Alexa.
2018: Domino's opened its 700th store in Australia. 
2019: Domino's launched New Pizza Chef with Augmented Reality, which allows customers to choose from endless flavour combinations and create their favourite pizza before their eyes through the Domino's app.
2019: Domino's launched voice ordering through the Google Assistant.
2019: Domino's Pizza Enterprises acquired Domino's Pizza territory in Denmark.
2021: Domino's Pizza Enterprises acquired Domino's Pizza Taiwan. 
2022: Domino's Pizza Enterprises acquired Domino’s Pizza businesses in Malaysia, Singapore and Cambodia.

See also
 List of fast food restaurant chains in Australia
 List of pizzerias in Australia

References

External links
 Domino's Pizza Enterprises corporate webpage
 Domino's Pizza Ph
 Domino's New Zealand corporate webpage
 Domino's Netherlands corporate webpage
 Domino's France corporate history webpage
 Domino's Belgium corporate history webpage
Domino's digital story and oral history: Queensland Business Leaders Hall of Fame 2018, State Library of Queensland

Australia and New Zealand Limited
Fast-food franchises
Pizzerias in Australia
Pizza chains of Australia
Australian subsidiaries of foreign companies
Restaurants established in 1983
Australian companies established in 1983
Companies listed on the Australian Securities Exchange
2005 initial public offerings